Cobas may refer to:

 Antonio Cobas (1952-2004), Spanish motorcycle designer, constructor and mechanic
 Yariulvis Cobas (born 1990), Cuban rower
 Cobas 4800, test for human papillomavirus
 Cyphostemma juttae, an ornamental plant also known as bastard cobas

The acronym COBAS can refer to:
 Communauté d'agglomération du Bassin d'Arcachon Sud, a metropolitan area in France along Arcachon Bay
 Confederazione dei Comitati di Base

See also
 Coba (disambiguation)